Field Flowers Goe (10 February 1832 – 25 June 1910) was an Anglican bishop of Melbourne.

Early life
Goe was born in Louth, Lincolnshire, England, the only son of Field Flowers Goe, a solicitor, and his wife Mary Jane. Goe was educated at the King Edward's Grammar School, Louth and later at Hertford College, Oxford where he graduated B.A. in 1857 and M.A. in 1860.

Career
Goe was ordained deacon and priest in 1858 by Archbishop Thomas Musgrave of York. Later that year Goe was appointed curate at Kingston upon Hull. He was rector of Sunderland from 1873 to 1877 and St George's, Bloomsbury, London, from 1877 to 1887. Goe had shown ability as a parish worker, preacher and organiser and in 1886 he was appointed the Bishop of Melbourne in succession to James Moorhouse. Though strongly Evangelical he was not bigoted and had signed the memorial protesting against the persecution of the ritualists. He was installed at the cathedral church of St James, Melbourne, on 14 April 1887. Goe was aware of many problems in his church which needed attention but resolved that until the cathedral could be finished and paid for these must stand aside. St Paul's Cathedral, Melbourne was completed, except for its spires, and consecrated on 22 January 1891. By that time the land boom had burst and for the next ten years Melbourne suffered from a severe depression. The financial question caused so many difficulties that it was almost impossible to do more than mark time. The forming of new dioceses had several times been discussed and, on 3 October 1901, an act was passed in the church assembly which gave to the state of Victoria three additional dioceses; Bendigo, Wangaratta and Gippsland.

Late life and legacy
In 1861 he married Emma, the daughter of William Hurst; they had no children. Goe's wife died on 24 July 1901 and he resigned on 1 November 1901 but acted as administrator until his departure for England on 7 April 1902. He lived in retirement at Wimbledon, near London, until his death on 25 June 1910.

Goe was a large man, and regarded as kind. He was neither a great scholar nor a great thinker, but he was a man of shrewd sense who preached peace on earth and goodwill to all men and kept his diocese going through a difficult period.

References
James Grant, 'Goe, Field Flowers (1832 - 1910)', Australian Dictionary of Biography, Volume 9, MUP, 1983, p. 39. Retrieved on 24 December 2008. 

1832 births
1910 deaths
People from Louth, Lincolnshire
19th-century Anglican bishops in Australia
Anglican bishops of Melbourne
English emigrants to Australia
Alumni of Hertford College, Oxford